4th AFCA Awards

Best Film:
The Dark Knight

The 4th Austin Film Critics Association Awards, honoring the best in filmmaking for 2008, were announced on December 16, 2008.

Top 10 Films
 The Dark Knight
 Slumdog Millionaire
 Milk
 Synecdoche, New York
 The Curious Case of Benjamin Button
 The Wrestler
 WALL-E
 Frost/Nixon
 Let the Right One In (Låt den rätte komma in)
 Gran Torino

Winners
 Best Film:
 The Dark Knight
 Best Director:
 Christopher Nolan – The Dark Knight
 Best Actor:
 Sean Penn – Milk
 Best Actress:
 Anne Hathaway – Rachel Getting Married
 Best Supporting Actor:
 Heath Ledger – The Dark Knight
 Best Supporting Actress:
 Taraji P. Henson – The Curious Case of Benjamin Button
 Best Original Screenplay:
 Synecdoche, New York – Charlie Kaufman
 Best Adapted Screenplay:
 The Dark Knight – Jonathan Nolan and Christopher Nolan
 Best Cinematography:
 The Fall – Colin Watkinson
 Best Original Score:
 The Dark Knight – James Newton Howard and Hans Zimmer
 Best Foreign Language Film:
 Let the Right One In (Låt den rätte komma in) • Sweden
 Best Documentary:
 Man on Wire
 Best Animated Feature:
 WALL-E
 Best First Film:
 Nacho Vigalondo – Timecrimes (Los cronocrímenes)
 Breakthrough Artist Award:
 Danny McBride – The Foot Fist Way, Pineapple Express, and Tropic Thunder
 Austin Film Award:
 Crawford – David Modigliani

References

External links
 IMDb page
 Official website

2008 film awards
2008
2008 in Texas